Valeriy Valeryanovych Sad (born 18 December 1998) is a Ukrainian professional footballer who plays as a midfielder for Ukrainian club Metalurh Zaporizhzhia.

References

External links
 Profile on Volyn Lutsk official website
 

1998 births
Living people
Ukrainian footballers
Ukrainian expatriate footballers
People from Varash
Association football midfielders
FC Skala Stryi (2004) players
Partizán Bardejov players
NK Veres Rivne players
FC Bukovyna Chernivtsi players
FC Volyn Lutsk players
FC Prykarpattia Ivano-Frankivsk (1998) players
FC Metalurh Zaporizhzhia players
Ukrainian First League players
Ukrainian Second League players
2. Liga (Slovakia) players
Sportspeople from Rivne Oblast
Ukrainian expatriate sportspeople in Slovakia
Expatriate footballers in Slovakia